Cléber Monteiro de Oliveira (born 23 May 1980 in Belo Horizonte, Minas Gerais), known simply as Cléber, is a Brazilian former professional footballer who played mainly as a defensive midfielder. He also held Portuguese citizenship, due to the many years spent in that country.

References

External links

1980 births
Living people
Footballers from Belo Horizonte
Brazilian footballers
Association football midfielders
Campeonato Brasileiro Série A players
Campeonato Brasileiro Série D players
Cruzeiro Esporte Clube players
Criciúma Esporte Clube players
Esporte Clube Juventude players
Villa Nova Atlético Clube players
Primeira Liga players
C.D. Nacional players
Vitória S.C. players
Segunda División players
FC Cartagena footballers
Brazilian expatriate footballers
Expatriate footballers in Portugal
Expatriate footballers in Spain
Brazilian expatriate sportspeople in Portugal
Brazilian expatriate sportspeople in Spain